Gorbănești is a commune in Botoșani County, Western Moldavia, Romania. It is composed of eight villages: Bătrânești, George Coșbuc, Gorbănești, Mihai Eminescu, Silișcani, Socrujeni, Viforeni and Vânători.

Natives
 Iulia Bulie

References

Communes in Botoșani County
Localities in Western Moldavia